Scott Gray may refer to:

Scott Gray (writer), comic book writer from New Zealand
Scott Gray (rugby union) (born 1978), rugby union footballer
 Scott Gray (motorcyclist), American motorcycle racer